Freedom of religion or belief in teaching, practice, worship, and observance in the Islamic Republic of Iran (IRI) is marked by Iranian culture, major religion and politics. The Constitution of the Islamic Republic of Iran mandates that the official religion of Iran is Shia Islam and the Twelver Ja'fari school, and also mandates that other Islamic schools are to be accorded full respect, and their followers are free to act in accordance with their own jurisprudence in performing their religious rites. The Constitution of Iran stipulates that Zoroastrians, Jews, and Christians are the only recognized religious minorities. The continuous presence of the country's pre-Islamic, non-Muslim communities, such as Zoroastrians, Jews, and Christians, had accustomed the population to the participation of non-Muslims in society.

However, despite official recognition of such minorities by the IRI government, the actions of the government create a "threatening atmosphere for some religious minorities".  Groups reportedly "targeted and prosecuted" by the IRI include Baháʼís, Sufis, Muslim-born converts to another religion (usually Christianity), and Muslims who "challenge the prevailing interpretation of Islam".
In 2020,  the US Commission on International Religious Freedom (ICRC) annual statement described the Islamic Republic as a country of particular concern under international law on religious freedom, and US Secretary of State included the Islamic Republic among the most egregious violators of religious freedom.

Religious demography

With a population of approximately 83 million, approximately 98 percent of Iran is Muslim (as of 2006). Of these  an estimated 89% were Shi'a and 9% Sunni (mostly Turkomen, Arabs, Baluchs, and Kurds living in the southwest, southeast, and northwest). Although there are no official statistics of the size of the Sufi Muslim population, some reports estimated between two and five million people practice Sufism compared to approximately 100,000 before 1979.

Baháʼís, Christians, Zoroastrians, Mandaeans, and Jews combined constitute approximately two percent of the population. The largest non-Muslim minority is the Baháʼí community, which has an estimated 300,000 to 350,000 adherents throughout the country. Estimates on the size of the Jewish community vary from 20,000 to 30,000. These figures represent a substantial reduction from the estimated 75,000 to 80,000 Jews who resided in the country prior to the 1979 Iranian Revolution. According to U.N. figures, there were approximately 300,000 Christians, the majority of whom are ethnic Armenians. Unofficial estimates indicated an Assyrian Christian population of approximately 10,000. There also were Protestant denominations, including evangelical churches. The Mandaean Sabaeans, a community whose religion draws on pre-Christian gnostic beliefs, numbered approximately 5,000 to 10,000 persons, with members residing primarily in Khuzestan in the southwest. As of 2006, there were indications that members of all religious minorities are emigrating at a higher rate than previously.

Status of religious freedom
The Constitution of the Islamic Republic of Iran states that "the investigation of individuals' beliefs is forbidden" and that "no one may be molested or taken to task simply for holding a certain belief." Authorities of the IRI also point out that five seats in the parliament  are reserved for the minority religions of Christianity, Judaism and Zoroastrianism. Iran’s Penal Code has no provisions criminalizing apostasy, as of January 18, 2012.

However, the adherents of religions not specifically protected under the Constitution do not enjoy freedom of activity, nor do Muslims who convert to another religion. Constitutional protections of freedom of belief are tempered by the fact that the death penalty has been imposed on the basis of vague charges, such as “‘attempts against the security of the state,’ ‘outrage against high-ranking officials,’ and ‘insults against the memory of Imam Khomeini and against the Supreme Leader of the Islamic Republic,’” and has been imposed on the basis of crimes like "drug smuggling" that religious (and political) dissidents have no plausible connection with.
While there is no specific law against apostasy, courts can hand down the death penalty for apostasy to ex-Muslims, and have done so in previous years, based on their interpretation of Sharia’a law and fatwas (legal opinions or decrees issued by Islamic religious leaders). There are laws against blasphemy and the punishment is death.
 
Sufis have been sentenced to prison terms for among other charges “establishing and membership in a deviant group.” Ex-Muslim atheists have been harassed. But limits on freedom of religion in the IRI most directly affects adherents of the Baháʼí Faith. The Government regards the Baháʼí community, whose faith originally arose from a movement within Islam, as a misguided or wayward "sect."

In 2004, the Expediency Council approved appending a note to Article 297 of the 1991 Islamic Punishments Act, authorizing collection of equal "blood money" (diyeh) for the death of Muslims and non-Muslims. All women and Baháʼí men were excluded from the equalization provisions of the bill. According to law, Baháʼí blood or anyone' who marries or helps a Baháʼí or gets involved with them is considered mobah, meaning it can be spilled with impunity.

The Government fuels anti-Baháʼí sentiment in the country. Government officials have stated that the Baháʼís are not a religious minority, but a political organization which was associated with the Shah's regime, is against the Iranian Revolution and engages in espionage activities. Nonetheless, government officials have reportedly  stated that as individuals, all Baháʼís are entitled to their beliefs and are protected under other articles of the Constitution as citizens.   In response to repeated attempts (between 1982 and 1984) by the Iranian representative to the United Nations to convince the United Nations diplomatic community that the Baháʼí Faith is a politicized organization with a record of criminal activism against the Iranian government, the United Nations has stated that there has been no evidence of Iran's claims and that the Baháʼí community in Iran professes its allegiance to the state. The United Nations pointed to the Baháʼí teaching of obedience to the government of one's country and stated that any involvement in any subversive acts against the government would be antithetical to precepts of the Baháʼí religion. The United Nations also stated that if the Iranian government did acknowledge that the Baháʼí Faith is a religion, it would be an admission that freedom of religion does not apply to all in Iran and that it is not abiding by the Universal Declaration of Human Rights and International Covenants on Human Rights to which it is a signatory.

Unlike the Baháʼí Faith, Judaism is a recognized religion in Iran. Despite Iran's official distrust of the country of Israel, the government does not directly attack Judaism itself.

The central feature of the country's Islamic republican system is rule by a "religious jurisconsult." The Supreme Leader of Islamic Republic controls the most important levers of power; he is chosen by a group of 86 religious scholars. All acts of the Majles (legislative body) must be reviewed for conformity with Islamic law and principles by the Council of Guardians, which is composed of six clerics appointed by the Supreme Leader and six Muslim jurists (legal scholars) nominated by the Head of the Judiciary and elected by parliament.

Religious activity is monitored closely by the Ministry of Islamic Culture and Guidance and by the Ministry of Intelligence and Security (MOIS). Adherents of recognized religious minorities are not required to register individually with the Government; however, their community, religious, and cultural events and organizations, including schools, are monitored closely. Registration of Baháʼís is a police function. Evangelical Christian groups have been pressured by government authorities to compile and submit membership lists for their congregations, but evangelicals have resisted this demand. Non-Muslim owners of grocery shops are required to indicate their religious affiliation on the fronts of their shops.

Restrictions on religious freedom
By law and practice, religious minorities can be elected to a representative body or to hold senior government or military positions, and have 5 of a total 270 seats in the majlis reserved for religious minorities. Three of these seats are reserved for members of the Christian faith, including two seats for the country's Armenian Christians, and one for Assyrians. There is also one seat for a member of the Jewish faith, and one for a member of the Zoroastrian faith. While members of the Sunni Muslim minority do not have reserved seats in the majlis, they are allowed to serve in the body. Sunni members tend to come from the larger Sunni communities. Members of religious minorities are allowed to vote. All of the minority religious groups, including Sunni, are barred from being elected president.

Members of religious minorities, are supported in their pursuit of serving in the judiciary and security services. All applicants for public sector employment are screened, irrespective of their faith, for their adherence to and knowledge of Islam, and members of religious minorities can serve in lower ranks of government employment. The constitution states that the country's army must be administered by individuals who are committed to the objectives of the Iranian constitution, regardless of faith. No religious minorities are exempt from military service. Members of religious minorities with a college education could serve as an officer during their mandatory military service but could not be a career military officer.

University applicants are required to pass an examination in Islamic theology, which limits the access of most religious minorities to higher education, although all public school students, including non-Muslims, must study Shia Islam. Applicants for public sector employment similarly are screened for their knowledge of Islam.

The Government allows recognized religious minorities to conduct the religious education of their adherents. This includes separate and privately funded Zoroastrian, Jewish, and Christian schools but does not include Baháʼí schools. The Ministry of Education, which imposes certain curriculum requirements, supervises these schools. With few exceptions, the directors of such private schools must be Muslim. Attendance at the schools is not mandatory for recognized religious minorities. All textbooks used in course work, including religious texts, must be approved for use by the Ministry of Education. Religious texts in non-Persian languages require approval by the authorities for use. Recognized religious minorities could provide religious instruction in non-Persian languages, but such texts required approval by the authorities. This approval requirement sometimes imposed significant translation expenses on minority communities. The condition imposed began from 1981 and were reiterated in the fall of 1983 - the Ministry of Education and Training ordered that religious education must be done in Persian, a text written by the MET must be taught in all registered religious minority schools, schools must seek special permission for any ceremonies, and in keeping with society-wide restrictions, female teachers and students must observe Islamic dress code including Hijab when necessary (this last was re-inforced in 1985.) Even most of the time and occasions, all female citizens, including non-Muslims, are required to wear Hijab as Iran is currently an Islamic republic. There have been other requirements of citizens as well. In 1984 the government began to request religious affiliation on questionnaires for passports. Events held for religious groups were broken into and if the meetings were mixed sexed and or women were not wearing headscarves, arrests were made and meetings canceled. It was prohibited that Muslims attend these meetings of minority groups - some groups restricted events so only their own religious members could attend. There were restrictions on music at events. Many of these restrictions moderated in time or were applied to or affected one religion more vs others (see below) and the government has occasionally also taken steps to bring attention to issues important to a religion - in 1982 the Ministry of Post and Telegraphs printed a stamp commemorating the birth of Jesus.

The textbook the MET wrote on the minority religions was called Talimat-e Maxhadi Vizheh-ye Aqaliathaye Mazhabi - (Kalimi, Zarthoshti, Masihi); Religious Studies Specifically for Religious Minorities: (Jews, Zoroastrians, Christians.) The course was taught by Muslim teachers at least 3 hrs/wk. All the religious minorities objected to the text in 1982 claiming the book was a violation of Article 13 guaranteeing freedom in religious teaching, that there were overt and covert passages from the Quran, and lack of any qualifications of the anonymous author(s) rather than members of the religious minorities writing about their own religions.  The situation has moderated for the Armenians significantly by 1995/6. There was also compromise of sorts allowed both Hebrew and Persian language use in Jewish schools.

Recognized religious minorities are allowed by the Government to establish community centers and certain cultural, social, sports, or charitable associations that they finance themselves. This does not apply to the Baháʼí community, which since 1983 has been denied the right to assemble officially or to maintain administrative institutions. Because the Baháʼí Faith has no clergy, the denial of the right to form such institutions and elect officers threatens its existence in the country.

Muslim men are free to marry non-Muslim women; a non-Muslim woman automatically becomes Muslim when the marriage takes place. However, marriages between Muslim women and non-Muslim men are not recognized unless the man shows proof that he has converted to Islam. If the child of a non-Muslim family converts to Islam, he or she inherits all the wealth of the family.

The Government is highly suspicious of any proselytizing of Muslims by non-Muslims and can be harsh in its response, in particular against Baháʼís , Sunni Muslims and evangelical Christians.

The Government does not ensure the right of citizens to change or renounce their religious faith. Apostasy, specifically conversion from Islam, can be punishable by death.

A summary of 2013 incidents of prison sentences, fines and punishments showed "79 religious minorities were sentenced to a total of 3620 months in prison, 200 months probation, 75 lashings and 41,030,000,000 rials in fines. In this area, 49% of the cases involved Baháʼí minorities, 16% Christian and Dervish and 14% Sunni minority. Arrests of religious minorities increased by 36% in relation to last year."

Baháʼís

The Baháʼí Faith originated in Iran during the 1860s. The Baháʼís believe their prophet to be the Messiah for this era. Initially it attracted a wide following among Shi'a clergy. The political and religious authorities of that time joined to suppress the movement, and since then the hostility of the Shi'a clergy to the Baháʼí Faith has remained strong. Baháʼís are considered apostates by the Shi'a clergy because of their claim to a valid religious revelation subsequent to that of Mohammed. The Baháʼí Faith is defined by the Government as a political "sect," historically linked to the Pahlavi regime and, hence, counterrevolutionary, even though one of the tenets of the Baháʼí Faith is non-involvement in partisan politics.

Baháʼís may not teach or practice their faith or maintain links with coreligionists abroad. The fact that the Baháʼí world headquarters (established by the founder of the Baháʼí Faith in the 19th century, in what was then Ottoman-controlled Palestine) is situated in what is now the state of Israel, allows the Iranian government to charge the Baháʼís with "espionage on behalf of Zionism," in particular when caught communicating with or sending monetary contributions to the Baháʼí headquarters.

Broad restrictions on Baháʼís appear to be aimed at destroying them as a community. Baháʼís repeatedly have been offered relief from mistreatment in exchange for recanting their faith. Baháʼí cemeteries, holy places, historical sites, administrative centers, and other assets were seized shortly after the 1979 revolution. None of the properties have been returned, and many have been destroyed.

Baháʼís are not allowed to bury and honor their dead in keeping with their religious tradition. They are permitted access only to areas of wasteland that the Government designates for their use, and are not allowed to mark the graves. Many historic Baháʼí gravesites have been desecrated or destroyed. In 2000 in the city of Abadeh, a Revolutionary Guard officer bulldozed a Baháʼí cemetery with 22 graves.

In what appeared to be a hopeful development, in 2002 the Government offered the Tehran community a piece of land for use as a cemetery. However, the land was in the desert, with no access to water, making it impossible to perform Baháʼí mourning rituals. In addition the Government stipulated that no markers be put on individual graves and that no mortuary facilities be built on the site, making it impossible to perform a proper burial.

Baháʼí group meetings and religious education, which often take place in private homes and offices, are curtailed severely. Public and private universities continue to deny admittance to Baháʼí students, a particularly demoralizing blow to a community that traditionally has placed a high value on education. Denial of access to higher education appears aimed at the eventual impoverishment of the Baháʼí community.

Baháʼís regularly are denied compensation for injury or criminal victimization. Government authorities claim that only Muslim plaintiffs are eligible for compensation in these circumstances.

In 1993, the UNSR reported the existence of a government policy directive regarding the Baháʼís. According to the directive, the Supreme Revolutionary Council instructed government agencies to block the progress and development of the Baháʼí community, expel Baháʼí students from universities, cut Baháʼí links with groups outside the country, restrict employment of Baháʼís, and deny Baháʼís "positions of influence," including in education. The Government claims that the directive is a forgery. However, it appears to be an accurate reflection of current government practice designed to eradicate slowly the Baháʼí community.

In September 2001, the Ministry of Justice issued a report that reiterated that government policy continued to aim at the eventual elimination of the Baháʼís as a community. It stated in part that Baháʼís would only be permitted to enroll in schools if they did not identify themselves as Baháʼís, and that Baháʼís preferably should be enrolled in schools that have a strong and imposing religious ideology. The report also stated that Baháʼís must be expelled from universities, either in the admission process or during the course of their studies, once it becomes known that they are Baháʼís.

While in recent years the Government has eased some restrictions, thereby enabling Baháʼís to obtain food-ration booklets and send their children to public elementary and secondary schools, the prohibition against the admission of Baháʼís to universities remains. Thousands of Baháʼís dismissed from government jobs in the early 1980s receive no unemployment benefits and have been required to repay the Government for salaries or pensions received from the first day of employment. Those unable to do so face prison sentences.

Iran has taken some positive steps in recognizing the rights of Baháʼís, as well as other religious minorities. In November 1999, President Khatami publicly stated that no one in the country should be persecuted because of their religious beliefs. He added that he would defend the civil rights of all citizens, regardless of their beliefs or religion. Subsequently, the Expediency Council approved the "Right of Citizenship" bill, affirming the social and political rights of all citizens and their equality before the law. In February 2000, following approval of the bill, the head of the judiciary issued a circular letter to all registry offices throughout the country that provided for any couple to be registered as husband and wife without being required to state their religious affiliation. The measure effectively permits the registration of Baháʼí marriages in the country. Previously Baháʼí marriages were not recognized by the Government, leaving Baháʼí women open to charges of prostitution. Thus children of Baháʼí marriages were not recognized as legitimate and therefore denied inheritance rights.

According to a U.S. panel, attacks on Baháʼís in Iran have increased since Mahmoud Ahmadinejad became president as well as Sunni Muslims. On May 14, 2008, members of an informal body known as the Friends that oversaw the needs of the Baháʼí community in Iran were arrested and taken to Evin prison. Officers from the Ministry of Intelligence in Tehran searched and raided the homes of the six people in the early hours of May 14. The arrest of the six follow the detention of another Baháʼí leader in March, who was originally taken to answer questions relating to the burial of a Baháʼí in the Baháʼí cemetery in Mashad. They have not been charged, and are prisoners of conscience. The Iran Human Rights Documentation Center has stated that they are concerned for the safety of the Baháʼís, and that the recent events are similar to the disappearance of 25 Baháʼí leaders in the early 1980s. The United States Commission on International Religious Freedom has stated that it fears that the "development signals a return to the darkest days of repression in Iran in the 1980s when Baha'is were routinely arrested, imprisoned, and executed."

Geneva, June 10, 2020, The Baháʼí International Community (BIC) issued a statement on the situation of Baháʼís in Iran, expressing concern over the "unprecedented number of new prison sentences, re-incarceration and a media campaign of hatred, are raising concerns of the long-persecuted religious minority in the country.," "re-incarceration," and "media disgusting campaign" against Baháʼís in Iran. According to the statement, the Iranian authorities have ramped up their persecution of the Baháʼís, targeting at least 71 individuals across the country in recent weeks. Reports of new threats to “uproot” the community in Shiraz.

Jews

While Jews are a recognized religious minority, allegations of official discrimination are frequent. The Government's anti-Israel policies, along with a perception among radical Muslim elements that all Jewish citizens support Zionism and the State of Israel, create a threatening atmosphere for the small Jewish community. Jewish leaders reportedly are reluctant to draw attention to official mistreatment of their community due to fear of government reprisal.

Persecution and discrimination has increased among the government and society since the Revolution in 1979. On the eve of Passover 1998, 13 Iranian Jewish men were arrested on charges of espionage. The United States and Israel both demanded their release. Iran accused the men of spying for "world arrogance" (being the U.S.) and the "Zionist regime" (being Israel). The conviction is highly doubted by the rest of the world.

The head of the Anti-Defamation Union says that the tomb of "Esther and Mordecai", the burial place of Xerxes' Jewish wife, which is considered a Jewish religious site, has been set on fire in Hamedan.

Mandaeans
According to the U.N. High Commission for Refugees Background Paper on Iran, the Mandaeans are regarded as Christians, and are included among the country's three recognized religious minorities. However, Mandaeans regard themselves not as Christians, but as adherents of a religion that predates Christianity in both belief and practice. Mandaeans enjoyed official support as a distinct religion prior to the revolution, but their legal status as a religion since then has been the subject of debate in the Majles and never has been clarified.

Abuses of religious freedom
While as of 2014  individuals who have been "targeted and prosecuted" by the Iranian state" for religious crimes of apostasy and blasphemy/"Swearing at the Prophet", are "diverse" and include "Muslim-born converts to Christianity, Bahá'ís, Muslims who challenge the prevailing interpretation of Islam, and others who espouse unconventional religious beliefs"; some cases have had "clear political overtones", while others "seem to be primarily of a religious nature".

On October 27, 2020, US Secretary of State Mike Pompeo issued a statement on World Religious Freedom Day, including Iran as one of the three of the world's most egregious violators of religious freedom—the People's Republic of China, Iran and North Korea—and that these countries "have tightened their coercive measures to silence their own people".

Baháʼís

According to the National Spiritual Assembly of the Baháʼís of the United States, since 1979 more than 200 Baháʼís have been killed and 15 have disappeared and are presumed dead. The Government continued to imprison and detain Baháʼís based on their religious beliefs.

The Government appears to adhere to a practice of keeping a small number of Baháʼís in arbitrary detention, some at risk of execution, at any given time. There were four Baháʼís reported to be in prison for practicing their faith at the end of the period covered by this report, two facing life sentences and two facing sentences of 15 years. In addition the Government appears to engage in harassment of the Baháʼí community by arresting Baháʼís arbitrarily, charging them, and then releasing them, often without dropping the charges against them. Those with charges still pending against them fear arrest at any time.

Two Baháʼís, Sirus Zabihi-Moghaddam and Hadayat Kashefi-Najafabadi, were tried in 1998 and later sentenced to death by an Islamic Revolutionary Court in Mashad for practicing their faith. In 2000 the sentences were reduced to 7 and 5 years respectively. Kashefi-Najafabadi was released in October 2001, after serving 4 years of his sentence. Zabihi-Moghaddam, who originally was arrested in November 1997, was released in June 2002.

The Government continued to imprison and detain Baháʼís based on their religious beliefs. Manuchehr Khulusi was arrested in June 1999 while visiting fellow Baháʼís in the town of Birjand, and was imprisoned until his release in May 2000. During his imprisonment, Khulusi was interrogated, beaten, held in solitary confinement, and denied access to his lawyer. The charges brought against him remain unknown, but they were believed to be related to his faith. The Islamic Revolutionary Court in Mashhad held a 2-day trial in September 1999 and sentenced Khulusi to death in February 2000. Despite Khulusi's release, it is unclear if the conviction and death sentence against him still stand.

The property rights of Baháʼís generally are disregarded. Since 1979 large numbers of private and business properties belonging to Baháʼís have been confiscated. During the period covered by this report, 14 Baháʼí homes were seized and handed over to an agency of Supreme Leader Khamenei. Authorities reportedly confiscated Baháʼí properties in Kata and forced several families to leave their homes and farmlands. Authorities also imprisoned some farmers, and did not permit others to harvest their crops. In 2000 authorities in Tehran, Isfahan, and Shiraz reportedly also confiscated eight buildings belonging to Baháʼís. In one instance, a woman from Isfahan who legally traveled abroad found that her home had been confiscated when she returned home. During the period covered by the report, the Government also seized private homes in which Baháʼí youth classes were held despite the owners having proper ownership documents. In 1999 three Baháʼí homes in Yazd and one in Arbakan were confiscated because their owners were Baháʼís. The Government's seizure of Baháʼí personal property, as well as its denial of Baháʼí access to education and employment, are eroding the economic base of the Baháʼí community.

In 1998, after a nationwide raid of more than 500 Baháʼí homes and offices, as well as numerous arrests, the authorities closed the Baháʼí Institute of Higher Learning. Also known as the "Open University," the Institute was established by the Baháʼí community shortly after the revolution to offer higher educational opportunities to Baháʼí students who had been denied access to the country's high schools and universities. The Institute remains closed.

It has become somewhat easier for Baháʼís to obtain passports in order to travel abroad. In addition some Iranian embassies abroad do not require applicants to state a religious affiliation. In such cases, it is easier for Baháʼís to renew passports. Nevertheless, in February 2001, the Government denied visas to foreigners in the Baháʼí delegation to the Asia-Pacific Regional Preparatory Conference for the World Conference on Racism, held in Tehran. The delegation was composed of American, Japanese, South Korean, and Indian nationals.

More recently, in the later months of 2005, an intensive anti-Baháʼí campaign was conducted by Iranian newspapers and radio stations. The state-run and influential Kayhan  newspaper, whose managing editor is appointed by Iran's supreme leader, Ayatollah Khamenei, ran nearly three dozen articles defaming the Baháʼí Faith The articles, which make use of fake historical documents, engage in a distortion of history to falsely describe Baháʼí moral principles in a manner that would be offensive to Muslims, thus inducing feelings of suspicion, distrust and hatred to members of the Baháʼí community in Iran.

Furthermore, a confidential letter sent on October 29, 2005 by the Chairman of the Command Headquarters of the Armed Forced in Iran states that the Supreme Leader of Iran, Ayatollah Khamenei has instructed the Command Headquarters to identify people who adhere to the Baháʼí Faith and to monitor their activities and gather any and all information about the members of the Baháʼí Faith. The letter was brought to the attention of the international community by Asma Jahangir, the Special Rapporteur of the United Nations Commission on Human Rights on freedom of religion or belief, in a March 20, 2006 press release.

In the press release the Special Rapporteur states that she "is highly concerned by information she has received concerning the treatment of members of the Baháʼí community in Iran."  She further states that "The Special Rapporteur is concerned that this latest development indicates that the situation with regard to religious minorities in Iran is, in fact, deteriorating."

Shahnaz Sabet, a Baháʼí citizen living in Shiraz, was arrested on Monday, October 12, 2020, and transferred to Adelabad Prison in Shiraz to serve his sentence.

Christians

The authorities are "vigilant in curbing proselytizing activities by evangelical Christians" including when services are conducted in Persian, but some sources indicate that Bibles and religious material on Persian are freely available to Iranians. Status related to this issues can be hard to determine because of poor relationships between Iran and other states, such as the United States, and due to Iran's strict controls of media and information. For example, Youcef Nadarkhani is an Jammiat-e Rabbani (Christian) pastor who was given a death sentence for apostasy, though eventually he was released after winning an appeal. Nevertheless, he was sentenced to three years in prison for proselytizing. Blasphemy law in Iran is used as a weapon against Christians and Christianity within Iran's borders.

The annual report of the World Religious Freedom Commission emphasizes that Christians in Iran face discrimination.

Some issues dealing with Christianity in Iran deal more directly with the Armenian ethnic minorities. For example, in early 1983 the MET specifically requested that the Armenian religious schools teach religion in Persian and time allocated to the Armenian languages must be reduced or eliminated. While the community responded to these orders issues raised in discussions included if the Armenians could speak/teach their own language other minorities would demand the same but also if Persian was used it would make proselytization easier as facility with Persian language use of religious issues improved. At the end of the 1983 academic year the MET requested the questions that were to be included in the final exam and the questions had to be sent in Persian and were ordered to be used in Persian as the final exam. Most fifth grade students refused to take the test and 3rd grade students handed in blank pages. The authorities then failed all the students. Some schools ignored the demands on languages, others did limit teaching to 2 hrs and others removed it entirely. Some continued religious classes and some dropped them all together. Observance of these rules on Armenian language teaching was most strict in Tehran while 6 to 8 hrs per week were common beyond. However, in 1995 the limit on languages was raised from 2 hrs to 5 hrs per week in Tehran as well. Circa 1996 a settlement was reached; during the first two months of each school year, the ministry-provided Persian book on religious ethics is taught in Armenian schools while Armenian-approved religious lessons are taught in Armenian for the rest of the year. This was not a totally satisfactory settlement of the issue for both sides, but it settled the issue.

In 1976, the Christian population numbered 168,593 people, mostly Armenians. Due to the Iran–Iraq War in the 1980s and the dissolution of the Soviet Union in the 1990s, almost half of the Armenians migrated to the newly independent Armenia. However, the opposite trend has occurred since 2000, and the number of Christians with Iranian citizenship increased to 109,415 in 2006 and 117,704 in 2011. According national Statistical centre Christians were fastest growing religion in Iran during 1996-2006 period (+38.9%), and second fastest during 2006-2011 period (+7.6%, after Zoroastrianism). At the same time, significant immigration of Assyrians from Iraq has been recorded due to massacres and harassment in post-Saddam Iraq. However, most of those Assyrians in Iran do not have Iranian citizenship. In 2008, the central office of the International Union of Assyrians, a mistranslation in the Iranian press for the Assyrian Universal Alliance,  was officially transferred to Iran after being hosted in the United States for more than four decades.

Jews
In 1984 the government began to request religious affiliation on questionnaires for passports. In contrast to other registered religious minorities starting in 1983, Jewish families were prevented from traveling as a group and if one member of the family traveled then another family member's passport was held. Regardless, thousands of Jews had emigrated in the first eight months of 1987 through Austria. Perhaps half the Jews left Iran leaving about 30,000 Jews by 1986. Some may have returned in the late 1980s. Generally the overall economic position has deteriorated significantly post revolution.

It is estimated that a minimum of 13 Jews have been executed by Iran since the country's revolution. Of them include two men (not of the ones written above) hanged in 1997 for allegedly spying for Israel and the United States; as well as businessman Ruhollah Kadkhodah-Zadeh who was hanged in prison without a public charge or legal proceeding, apparently for assisting Jews to emigrate.

Shia
The Special Clerical Court (SCC) system, established in 1987 to investigate offenses and crimes committed by clerics and which the Supreme Leader oversees directly, is not provided for in the constitution and operates outside the domain of the judiciary. In particular, critics alleged that the clerical courts were used to prosecute certain clerics for expressing controversial ideas and for participating in activities outside the area of religion, including journalism.

During the latter part of 2000, a Special Clerical Court began the trial of Hojatoleslam Hassan Yousefi Eshkevari, a cleric who participated in a conference in Berlin on Iran, on charges of apostasy, "corruption on earth," "declaring war on God," and "denial of basic religious principles," which potentially carry the death penalty. Eshkevari has called for more liberal interpretations of Islamic law in certain areas. The verdict was not announced, but, according to Amnesty International, Eshkevari widely was reported to have been sentenced to death. In November 2001, following domestic and international criticism, his sentence reportedly was reduced to 30 months' imprisonment and removal of his status as a cleric. On February 6, 2005, the special clerical court agreed to his conditional release (parole); he had served two-thirds of his seven-year sentence and was therefore eligible for parole under the law.

Independent newspapers and magazines have been closed, and leading publishers and journalists were imprisoned on charges of hate speech and "insulting Islam" and sparking revolutionary sentiments whilst "calling into question the Islamic foundation of the Republic." In 2002 academic Hashem Aghajari was sentenced to death for blasphemy against Muhammed, based on a speech in which he challenged Muslims not to blindly follow the clergy, provoking an international and domestic outcry.

In 2003 his death sentence was revoked by the Supreme Court, but the case was sent back to the lower court for retrial. He was retried on charges that did include revolutionary incitement and was sentenced to five years' imprisonment, two of which were suspended, and five years of additional "deprivation of social right" (meaning that he could not teach or write books or articles). His time served was counted towards his three-year sentence; the court converted the remainder of the time to a fine. He was released on bail in 2004.

Late November, 2018 prison warden Qarchak women prison in Varamin, near the capital Tehran attacked and bit three Dervish religious minority prisoners when they demanded their confiscated belongings back.

Zoroastrians

Zoroastrian served as the national- or state religion of a significant portion of the Iranian people for many centuries before it was gradually marginalized by Islam from the 7th century onwards. The political power of the pre-Islamic Iranian dynasties lent Zoroastrians immense prestige in ancient times, and some of its leading doctrines were adopted by other religious systems.

There are no official reports of government harassment of the Zoroastrian community to date. Unofficial reports of discrimination in employment and education has come up, but are by no means frequent. Zoroastrians are free to make, without government interference, their annual pilgrimage to one of the holiest sites of their faith, the temple of Chak-Chak (near the city of Yazd).

Societal attitudes
The continuous activity of the country's pre-Islamic, non-Muslim communities, such as Zoroastrians, Jews, and Christians, has accustomed the population to the presence of non-Muslims in society. However, actions of the conservative parts of society and the government create a threatening atmosphere for some religious minorities. For a Christian, Jew or Zoroastrian there is constant pressure at school to convert.

The Jewish community has been reduced to less than one-half of its prerevolutionary size. Some of this emigration is connected with the larger, general waves of departures following the establishment of the Islamic Republic, but some also stems from continued perceived anti-Semitism on the part of the government and within society.

The government's anti-Israel policies, along with a perception among radical Muslims that all Jewish citizens supported Zionism and the state of Israel, created a hostile atmosphere for the small community. For example, in 2005 many newspapers celebrated the one-hundredth anniversary of the anti-Semitic publication Protocols of the Elders of Zion. Jewish leaders reportedly were reluctant to draw attention to official mistreatment of their community due to fear of government reprisal.

See also

 Religion in Iran
 Human rights in Iran

References

External links
 The Constitution of Islamic Republic of Iran
 Religious Freedom and the Middle East at The Washington Institute for Near East Policy PolicyWatch
 Iran Human Rights Documentation Center

Religion in Iran
Iran
Human rights in Iran